Dundee is a town in Polk County, Florida, United States. The population was 3,717 at the 2010 census. It is part of the Lakeland–Winter Haven Metropolitan Statistical Area.

History
A post office called Dundee has been in operation since 1912. The town was named after Dundee, in Scotland. Dundee was incorporated as a town in 1925.

Geography and climate

Dundee is located in the humid subtropical zone under (Köppen climate classification: Cfa).

Demographics

At the 2000 census there were 2,912 people, 1,123 households, and 811 families in the town. The population density was 740.7 inhabitants per square mile (286.1/km). The racial makeup of the town was 69.92% White, 22.05% African American, 0.14% Native American, 0.93% Asian, 0.03% Pacific Islander, 5.56% from other races, and 1.37% from two or more races. Hispanic or Latino of any race were 11.37%.

Of the 1,123 households 28.3% had children under the age of 18 living with them, 55.7% were married couples living together, 13.2% had a female householder with no husband present, and 27.7% were non-families. 24.1% of households were one person and 14.3% were one person aged 65 or older.  The average household size was 2.57 and the average family size was 3.04.

The age distribution was 26.0% under the age of 18, 6.9% from 18 to 24, 23.0% from 25 to 44, 20.9% from 45 to 64, and 23.2% 65 or older.  The median age was 40 years. For every 100 females, there were 91.8 males.  For every 100 females age 18 and over, there were 87.7 males.

The median household income was $29,174 and the median family income  was $33,831. Males had a median income of $30,218 versus $20,449 for females. The per capita income for the town was $14,411.  About 11.8% of families and 12.8% of the population were below the poverty line, including 19.3% of those under age 18 and 11.8% of those age 65 or over.

In 2010 Dundee had a population of 3,717.  The racial and ethnic composition of the population was 49.8% non-Hispanic white, 25.2% black or African American, 0.6% Native American, 1.7% Asian, 0.5% non-Hispanic from some other race, 3.4% two or more races and 21.3% Hispanic or Latino.  11.6% of the population was Mexican while 6.7% of the population was Puerto Rican.

Transportation

The major roads running through Dundee are:
 US 27 – Located just west of town, this divided highway leads to Lake Wales and Haines City.
 SR 17 – This Scenic Highway goes through the center of town and provides an alternate route parallel to US 27 across eastern Polk County.
 SR 542 – Also called Dundee Road, it leads from downtown Dundee to US 27 and on westward, straight to downtown Winter Haven.

References

External links

 Town of Dundee official site

Towns in Polk County, Florida
Towns in Florida
1925 establishments in Florida